"China" is a song by Red Rockers, released in 1983. It was a hit single, peaking at No. 53 on the Billboard Hot 100 and No. 19 on the Mainstream Rock chart.

The recordings

7" track listing 
 "China"
 "Voice of America"

12" track listing 
 "China"
 "China" (Dance Mix)
 "Ball of Confusion (That's What the World Is Today)"

History
"China" was originally one of the ten songs on Red Rockers' second full-length album, Good as Gold. The single was released on the joint label Columbia/415.
In the wake of 415's deal with Columbia, "Voice of America" was relegated to the B-side of the single, and "China" became the breakout single for the band.
Although the song did not reach the Billboard top 10, it has had an enduring lifespan. The song's popularity was enhanced by its colorful music video, which was a regular selection on MTV during its early years. The video was filmed in New Orleans, the band's hometown.

Legacy
"China" was described by rock critic Ira Robbins as "a startlingly pretty pop song", and it represented a major change in the sound and style of Red Rockers: "Gone was the raging rhetoric, replaced by... articulate, ringing guitars and John Griffith's newly smoothed-up vocals."

"China" was included on Rhino Records' new wave compilation album series, Just Can't Get Enough: New Wave Hits of the 80's. In 2000, John Thomas Griffith re-recorded the song with his band Cowboy Mouth for their studio album Easy.

In spite of – or perhaps because of – its amorphous qualities, the song remains an accessible touchstone for American pop cultural references to China decades after its release.

References

External links
"China" lyrics

1983 songs
1983 debut singles
Red Rockers songs
Songs about China
Songs written by David Kahne
Song recordings produced by David Kahne
Columbia Records singles